Francisco Agullo (died 1648) was a Spanish painter. He was born in Concentaina, and in 1637, he painted an altar-piece for the convent of San Sebastian.

References

1648 deaths
People from Alicante
17th-century Spanish painters
Spanish male painters
Spanish Baroque painters
Year of birth unknown